The Wagner Seahawks are composed of 23 teams representing Wagner College in intercollegiate athletics. Sports sponsored for both men and women are basketball, cross country, golf, lacrosse, tennis, track & field (both indoor and outdoor, which the NCAA classifies as two separate sports for each sex), and water polo. Sports sponsored only for men are baseball and football. Women-only sports are fencing, soccer, softball, swimming & diving, and triathlon, and field hockey. The Seahawks compete in the NCAA Division I Football Championship Subdivision (FCS) and are members of the Northeast Conference for all sports except water polo, in which the women compete in the Metro Atlantic Athletic Conference and the men compete in the Collegiate Water Polo Association, and triathlon, in which all currently competing NCAA institutions are officially classified as independents.

Teams 
A member of the Northeast Conference, Wagner sponsors teams in 10 men's and 14 women's NCAA-sanctioned sports.

Notable alumni
Andrew Bailey, former Major League Baseball All-Star pitcher
P.J. Carlesimo, NBA Head Coach, Wagner Basketball Head Coach 1976-1982
Nick Dini, Major League Baseball catcher for the Kansas City Royals
Cam Gill, National Football League linebacker for the Tampa Bay Buccaneers

References

External links